The Vidarbha Cricket Association Stadium, also known as New VCA Stadium, is a cricket stadium in Nagpur, Maharashtra, India. It is the largest cricket stadium in India in terms of field area, and the qualities of the stadium have been praised by the International Cricket Council. 

The ground, located at Jamtha on the southern outskirts of Nagpur, was inaugurated in 2008, replacing the old Vidarbha Cricket Association Ground as the city's main stadium. The VCA Stadium is the home ground for the Vidarbha and Central Zone cricket teams for the domestic Ranji Trophy and Duleep Trophy tournaments respectively. As of January 2020 it has hosted more T20I matches (12) than any other stadium in India. As of 10 November 2019 it has hosted 6 Tests, 9 ODIs and 12 T20Is.

Overview

Sachin Tendulkar said "the facilities exceeded all expectations" and Ricky Ponting commented on the comfort in the changing rooms.
Rajasthan Royals skipper Shane Warne was extremely pleased with the "largeness of the ground" after his team's two-run win over Deccan Chargers. "Michael Lumb's slog to deep mid-wicket found a fielder. Now, if this was M. A. Chidambaram Stadium or M. Chinnaswamy Stadium, then that ball would have landed in a taxi going to the team hotel. We need big grounds like these," Warne said. It has 80-yard straight boundaries and 85-yard square boundaries, which makes it one of the largest grounds (in terms of playing area) in the world.

Lalit Modi said the VCA was "by far the best stadium in India". The stadium has been praised not only by the players but also by commentators and journalists because of the facilities. Alan Wilkins said, "It is a fabulous stadium, a Colosseum here in Nagpur. It has the most impressive Press box for the travelling media. It really is a wonderful venue."

The first international match at this venue was the Fourth Test between India and Australia in November 2008, which India won by 172 runs. The Australian spinner Jason Krejza finished with 12 wickets, while Harbhajan Singh claimed seven for India.

Four matches were played at the stadium during the 2011 Cricket World Cup. The highest Test scores are by India: 566/8, 558/6 and 441. The leading run scorers in Tests are Virendar Sehwag (357), Virat Kohli (354) and MS Dhoni (339). The leading wicket takers in a Test are R Ashwin (23 wickets), Ishant Sharma (19) and Harbhajan Singh (13 wickets). The highest ODI scores are by India 354/7, India 351/4, Australia 350/6, New Zealand 302/7 and Sri Lanka 302/7. The leading scorers in ODIs are Virat Kohli (325), Mahendra Singh Dhoni (268) and Rohit Sharma (204). The leading wicket takers in ODIs are Mitchell Johnson (9 wickets), Ravindra Jadeja (6 wickets) and Dale Steyn (5) and Harbhajan Singh (5).

Various format record

Test records
 Highest team total: 610/6d, by India against Sri Lanka in 2017/18.
 Lowest team total: 79, by South Africa against India in 2015/16.
 Highest individual score: 253*, by Hashim Amla (South Africa) against India in 2010/11.
 Best bowling in an innings: 8/215, by Jason Krejza (Australia) against India in 2008/09.
Most runs scored by a player: Virendar Sehwag 357.
Most wickets taken: Ravichandran Ashwin 27.

ODI records
 Highest team total: 354/7, by India against Australia in 2009/10
 Lowest team total: 123, by Canada against Zimbabwe on 28 February 2011.
 Highest individual score: 156, by George Bailey against India in 2013/14.
 Most runs scored by a player: Virat Kohli- 325 runs, followed by MS Dhoni- 268 runs and Rohit Sharma- 204 runs.
 Best bowling in an innings: 4/33, by Mitchell Johnson against New Zealand in February 2011.
Most wickets taken: Mitchell Johnson- 9 wickets and Ravindra Jadeja - 6 wickets.

T20I records
 Highest team total: 219/5, by Sri Lanka against India in 2009/10.
 Lowest team total: 79/10, by India against New Zealand in 2016/17.
 highest individual score: 81, by Mohammad Naim against India in 2019/20.
 Best bowling in an innings: 6/7 by Deepak Chahar against Bangladesh in 2019/20.

List of international cricket five wicket hauls

Tests

One Day Internationals

Twenty20 Internationals

Gallery

See also
 Vidarbha Cricket Association Ground
 List of Test cricket grounds
 List of stadiums by capacity
 List of cricket grounds by capacity
 List of cricket grounds in India
 List of stadiums in India

References

External links

 Official Vidarbha Cricket Association Website
VCA Stadium
Inaugural match photos
Stadium's Statistics
Nagpur Photos: Jamtha Cricket Stadium

Test cricket grounds in India
Sport in Nagpur
Vidarbha
Sports venues in Maharashtra
Sports venues in Nagpur
Cricket grounds in Maharashtra
Buildings and structures in Nagpur
Cricket in Vidarbha
2008 establishments in Maharashtra
Sports venues completed in 2008
2011 Cricket World Cup stadiums